Irwin Edman   (November 28, 1896 – September 4, 1954) was an American philosopher and professor of philosophy.

Biography
Irwin Edman was born in New York City to Jewish parents.  He grew up in the Morningside Heights neighborhood of Manhattan, adjacent to Columbia University, with which he was to be affiliated his entire adult life.  Edman spent his high-school years at Townsend Harris Hall, a New York high school for superior pupils.  He then attended Columbia University, where he graduated Phi Beta Kappa and earned his bachelor's degree in 1917 and his Ph.D. in 1920.  During his student years at Columbia he was a member of the Boar's Head Society. He became a professor of philosophy at Columbia, and during the course of his career he rose to serve as head of the philosophy department.  He also served as a visiting lecturer at Oxford University, Amherst College, the University of California, and Harvard and Wesleyan Universities.  In 1945 the United States Department of State and the Brazilian government sponsored a series of lectures he gave in Rio de Janeiro.

Edman was known for the "charm and clarity" of his writing and for being an open-minded critic.   He was a popular professor and served as a mentor to undergraduate students, notably Pulitzer Prize-winning author Herman Wouk (Columbia class of 1934), who dedicated his first novel to Edman.

He was the brother-in-law of Lester Markel, the longtime Sunday editor of The New York Times.

In addition to writing philosophical works, Irwin Edman was a frequent contributor to literary magazines such as The New Yorker, The Atlantic Monthly (later renamed The Atlantic), The New York Times Magazine, Harper's Weekly, Commentary, and Horizon.

In 1953, Edman was elected vice president of the National Institute of Arts and Letters (later succeeded by the American Academy of Arts and Letters).

Edman published many books on philosophy as well as poetry and some fiction.  His books include Philosopher’s Holiday, Richard Kane Looks at Life, Four Ways of Philosophy, Philosopher's Quest, and Arts and the Man: An Introduction to Aesthetics.

He died, of a heart attack, on September 4, 1954, in New York.

Bibliography

 Arthur Schopenhauer: The World As Will And Idea 
 Arts and the man: a short introduction to aesthetics (1939)
 Candle in the Dark : A Postscript to Despair (1939) 
 Don Quixote: The Ingenious Man of La Mancha (Introduction)
 Ecclesiastes, with an Essay by Irwin Edman; Odyssey Press, New York, 1946 
 Emerson's Essays, First & Second Series Complete in One Volume 
 Epictetus. Discourses and Enchiridion. Based on the Translation of Thomas... 
 Fountainheads of Freedom: The Growth of the Democratic Idea, with Herbert W. Schneider
 Human Traits and Their Social Significance 
 John Dewey: his contribution to the American tradition (as editor)
 Landmarks for beginners in philosophy 
 Machiavelli: The Prince (Introduction and Preface) (1954)
 Meditations. Marcus Aurelius and His Times. The Transition from Paganism to Christianity (1945) 
 Philosopher's Holiday (1938)
 Philosopher's Quest (1947)
 Poems
 The Mind Of Paul (1935) 
 The Philosophy of Plato. Jowett Translation 
 The Philosophy of Santayana 
 The Philosophy of Schopenhauer (1928)
 The Uses of Philosophy
 The Works of Plato 
 The World, the Arts and the Artist 
 Under Whatever Sky (1951)

Poems
"Brief Introduction to the Problems of Philosophy" The New Yorker 25/50 (4 February 1950) : 32

References

External links

 
 
 A Tribute to Irwin Edman on Columbia University's website
 Edman's introduction to Schopenhauer's main work

1896 births
1954 deaths
American Jews
American philosophy academics
Columbia University faculty
Columbia College (New York) alumni
Wesleyan University faculty
Harvard University staff
The New Yorker people
Townsend Harris High School alumni
People from Morningside Heights, Manhattan
Columbia Graduate School of Arts and Sciences alumni
Members of the American Academy of Arts and Letters